Pablopavo (born 30 March 1978 as Paweł Sołtys) is a Polish reggae and raggamuffin vocalist, songwriter, and radio DJ. He has a radio show on Roxy FM called Tramwaj z Pragi. Pablopavo is the lead singer of Warsaw-based reggae band Vavamuffin. He has also recorded with a side-project called Pablopavo i Ludziki. He is one of the first vocalists singing raggamuffin in Polish and specializes in long and complicated freestyle vocal parts.

History
Pablopavo started his career in 2000 as the vocalist and guitarist of the band Saduba, and in 2001 of the band Magara.
In 2002 he founded, together with Reggaenerator and Krzak, Zjednoczenie Sound System, which promotes Jamaican sound system music. Since 2003, he is the lead singer of popular Polish reggae band Vavamuffin, which has released five studio albums to date.

His other projects include Ba-Lan Soundsystem and the band Sedativa (since 2006). He has recorded with artists such as Fu (Olsen/Fu, Zipera, ZIP Skład), Hemp Gru, O.S.T.R., Sidney Polak, Sedativa, Dreadsquad, Magiera, James Ashen, Habakuk, Junior Stress, Maleo Reggae Rockers, and Molesta Ewenement.

Pablopavo i Ludziki, Głodne kawałki (2008-present)
Apart from singing in Vavamuffin and various sound systems, Pablopavo started a solo career. His debut single Zykamu/Dola Selektora was released in 2008 on 7" vinyl and was initially intended to promote Pablopavo's debut album. However, as the release of the album was delayed, Zykamu/Dola Selektora was left as a stand-alone single.

Pablopavo's debut studio album Telehon, signed Pablopavo i Ludziki, was released on 26 September 2009 through Karrot Kommando label, which specializes in reggae music. The album was promoted by the single "Telehon".

On 30 March 2011, the second Pablopavo i Ludziki album, titled 10 piosenek, was released through Karrot Kommando.

Pablopavo's third album, Głodne kawałki, was recorded together with music producer Rafał "Praczas" Kołaciński. It was released on 28 November 2011.

At the beginning of 2013, a song titled "Koty" was released as the first single from Pablopavo's upcoming album.

Discography

Music videos

Awards and nominations

Superjedynki

|-
| rowspan="2" align="center"|2010 || rowspan="2"|Telehon || Hip-hop Album || 
|-
| Debut Album ||

References

External links

 Official website

1978 births
Polish singer-songwriters
Living people
Polish reggae singers
21st-century Polish male singers
21st-century Polish singers